Louisiana Purchase is a musical with music and lyrics by Irving Berlin and book by Morrie Ryskind based on a story by B. G. DeSylva. Set in New Orleans, the musical lightly satirises Louisiana Governor Huey Long and his control over Louisiana politics. An honest U.S. senator travels to Louisiana to investigate corruption in the Louisiana Purchase Company; the company's lawyer attempts to divert him via the attentions of two beautiful women, but the senator maintains his integrity and ends up marrying one of them. In 1941 it was adapted for the film Louisiana Purchase directed by Irving Cummings.

The show opened at the Shubert Brothers' Imperial Theatre, New York City on May 28, 1940 and ran for 444 performances. It was produced by Buddy De Sylva, who also wrote the story, and staged by Edgar MacGregor. The musical orchestrations were by Robert Emmett Dolan and N. Lang Van Cleve, with the ballets by George Balanchine and the musical staging and dances by Carl Randall. On June 19, 1996, a concert version with the complete score was recorded at Carnegie Hall (during four performances), including three additional songs cut from the original album.

Songs

Act I
 The Letter - Sam Liebowitz
 Apologia - Secretary, Sam Liebowitz and Ensemble
 Sex Marches On - Jim Taylor, Col. Davis D. Davis Sr., Davis D. Davis Jr., Dean Manning and Police Captain Whitfield
 Louisiana Purchase - Beatrice, The Martins, the Buccaneers and Ensemble
 It's a Lovely Day Tomorrow - Madame Bordelaise
 Louisiana Purchase (Reprise) - Beatrice, Emmy-Lou, Lee Davis, The Martins and Ensemble
 Outside of That I Love You - Jim Taylor and Marina van Linden
 You're Lonely and I'm Lonely - Marina van Linden and Senator Oliver P. Loganberry
 (Dance with Me) Tonight at the Mardi Gras - The Martins

Act II
 Latins Know How - Madame Bordelaise and Ensemble
 What Chance Have I (with Love) - Senator Oliver P. Loganberry
 The Lord Done Fixed Up My Soul - Beatrice, Abner, the Buccaneers and Ensemble
 Fools Fall in Love - Jim Taylor and Marina van Linden
 Old Man's Darling - Young Man's Slave? - Marina van Linden, Spirit of Jim Taylor and Spirit of Senator Loganberry
 You Can't Brush Me Off - Emmy-Lou, Lee Davis and The Martins

Casts

References

Bordman, Gerald (2001). American Musical Theater: A Chronicle. 3rd ed. New York: Oxford University Press. 
Suskin, Steven (2000)  "Showtunes" 3rd ed. [Oxford University Press]

External links
 Louisiana Purchase at the Internet Broadway Database

Musicals by Irving Berlin
1940 musicals
Broadway musicals